The Laurence Olivier Award for Best Performance in a Supporting Role was an annual award presented by the Society of London Theatre in recognition of achievements in commercial London theatre. The awards were established as the Society of West End Theatre Awards in 1976, and renamed in 1984 in honour of English actor and director Laurence Olivier.

This commingled actor/actress award was introduced in 1985, merging the preceding awards for Best Actor in a Supporting Role and Best Actress in a Supporting Role. However, this comingled award was suspended after its presentation in 1990; from 1991 to 2012, the supporting category vacillated at random between the commingled award (presented for 12 different seasons) and the original split pair of awards (presented for the other 11 seasons). The comingled Best Performance in a Supporting Role was last presented in 2012, and fully retired thereafter.

On the 16 occasions that this commingled award was given, it was presented six times to an actress and ten times to an actor.

Winners and nominees

1980s

1990s

2000s

2010s

See also
 Drama Desk Award for Outstanding Featured Actor in a Play
 Drama Desk Award for Outstanding Featured Actress in a Play
 Tony Award for Best Featured Actor in a Play
 Tony Award for Best Featured Actress in a Play

References

External links
 

Laurence Olivier Awards